Joan Elizabeth Groothuysen (September 6, 1957 – May 7, 2018) was a Canadian cross-country skier. She competed at the 1976 and 1980 Winter Olympics in the 5 km and 10 km individual races and 4×5 km relay with the best achievement of seventh place in the relay in 1976. She died of cancer in Edmonton in 2018.

Cross-country skiing results

Olympic Games

World Championships

References

1957 births
2018 deaths
Canadian female cross-country skiers
Cross-country skiers at the 1976 Winter Olympics
Cross-country skiers at the 1980 Winter Olympics
Olympic cross-country skiers of Canada
Skiers from Ottawa
20th-century Canadian women